Isodacrys is a genus of broad-nosed weevils in the beetle family Curculionidae. There are 20 described species in Isodacrys, ranging from the southern United States of America to Honduras.

Natural history
Isodacrys species are distributed from south of the United States of America to Honduras, mainly across Mexican and Central American mountain ranges of ~1500–3100 meters above sea level; some species also occur in lowlands. The adults of Isodacrys have been found in Quercus, Pinus and in other plants of different families as Asteraceae, Fabaceae, Rhamnaceae, Cucurbitaceae, Betulaceae, Malvaceae, and Solanaceae. Some adults have been collected from leaf litter and under rocks. Immature stages remain unknown.

Species
These 13 species belong to the genus Isodacrys:

 Isodacrys apicale Howden, 1961 c g
 Isodacrys brevirostre Howden, 1961 c g
 Isodacrys buchanani Howden, 1961 c g
 Isodacrys burkei Howden, 1961 i g b
 Isodacrys crispum Howden, 1961 c g
 Isodacrys ellipticum Howden, 1961 c g
 Isodacrys geminatum Howden, 1961 c g
 Isodacrys guatemalenum Sharp, 1911 c g
 Isodacrys mexicanum Sharp, 1911 c g
 Isodacrys minutum Sharp, 1911 c g
 Isodacrys orizabae Sharp, 1911 c g
 Isodacrys ovipennis (Schaeffer, 1908) i c g
 Isodacrys schwarzi Champion, 1911 c g

Data sources: i = ITIS, c = Catalogue of Life, g = GBIF, b = Bugguide.net

References

Further reading

 
 
 
 

Entiminae
Articles created by Qbugbot